The Ambassador Extraordinary and Plenipotentiary of Ukraine to Cuba is the ambassador of Ukraine to Cuba. The current ambassador is Oleksandr Bozhko. He assumed the position in 2013. 

The first Ukrainian ambassador to Cuba assumed his post in 1992, the same year a Ukrainian embassy opened in Havana.

List of ambassadors

Ukraine
 1995–1997 Oleksandr Taranenko
 1997–1997 Oleksandr Kulinich (Charge d'Affairs)
 1997–2000 Yevhen Svynarchuk
 2000–2001 Volodymyr Krasilchuk (Charge d'Affairs)
 2001–2005 Viktor Pashchuk
 2005–2005 Viktor Kharaminsky (Charge d'Affairs)
 2005–2008 Oleksandr Hniedykh
 2008–2009 Oleksandr Khrypunov (Charge d'Affairs)
 2009–2013 Tetiana Sayenko
 2013–2013 Volodymyr Kozlov (Charge d'Affairs)
 2013–2014 Oleksandr Bozhko
 2014  Oleksandr Kyrychok (Charge d'Affairs)
 From May 4, 2022 for now  Kostyuk Iryna Kostyantinivna — Ambassador Extraordinary and Plenipotentiary of Ukraine to the Republic of Cuba.

External links 
  Embassy of Ukraine to Cuba: Previous Ambassadors

 
Cuba
Ukraine